Bagpat Assembly constituency is one of the 403 constituencies of the Uttar Pradesh Legislative Assembly, India. It is a part of the Bagpat district and one of the five assembly constituencies in the Bagpat Lok Sabha constituency. First election in this assembly constituency was held in 1957 after the "DPACO (1956)" (delimitation order) was passed in 1956. The constituency was not in existence during the 4th and the 5th legislative assemblies of Uttar Pradesh. The constituency was formed again in 1974. After the "Delimitation of Parliamentary and Assembly Constituencies Order, 2008" was passed in 2008, the constituency was assigned identification number 52.Yogesh Dhama is current MLA, hailing from the BJP and won by margin of 31,360 votes in 2017 elections, and will contest again in 2022 assembly elections.

Wards / Areas
Extent of Baghpat Assembly constituency is Khekra Tehsil; KC Pilana, PCs Baghpat, Pali, Pawla Bagamabad, Tatiri of Baghpat KC, Baghpat MB, Aminagar Sarai NP & Agarwal Mandi NP of Baghpat Tehsil.

Members of the Legislative Assembly

Election results

2022

2017

2012

See also
Bagpat district
Bagpat Lok Sabha constituency
Sixteenth Legislative Assembly of Uttar Pradesh
Uttar Pradesh Legislative Assembly

References

External links
 

Assembly constituencies of Uttar Pradesh
Bagpat district